The Gutenberg Prize of the City of Leipzig (German: Gutenberg-Preis der Stadt Leipzig)  is an award in memory of Johannes Gutenberg. Since 1959, the prize honor personalities or institutions that make outstanding contributions to the promotion of the art of books. Awarded people and Institutions have set standards with their artistic, technical, or scientific achievements, especially in the areas of typography, book illustration, book publishing, and book production.

The award is in the Leipzig tradition as a historic center for print quality and care for book art.

Since 1993, the Gutenberg Prize has been alternated with the Gutenberg Prize of the City of Mainz and the Gutenberg International Society annually. The prize is endowed with 10,000 euros.

Winners 

 1959: Horst Erich Wolter
 1960: Karl Gossow; Offizin Andersen Nexö Leipzig
 1961: Albert Kapr; Erfurt printing company
 1962: Werner Klemke; Typoart Dresden / Leipzig
 1963: Solomon Benediktinowitsch Telingater, Fritz Helmuth Ehmcke
 1964: University of Graphics and Book Art of Leipzig
 1965: Lajos Lengyel, Jan Tschichold; Large-scale graphic company Völkerfreundschaft Dresden
 1966: Hans Baltzer, Bruno Rebner
 1967: publishing house Philipp Reclam jun. Leipzig
 1968: Walter Schiller, Vasil Jontschev; Interdruck Leipzig
 1969: Bruno Kaiser; Röderdruck Leipzig
 1970: German Museum of Books and Writing Leipzig; Graphic arts institution H.F. Jütte Leipzig
 1971: Andrei Dmitrijewitsch Gontscharow
 1972: Horst Kunze, Roman Tomaszewski
 1973: Hellmuth Tschörtner
 1974: Insel publishing house "Anton Kippenberg" Leipzig, publishing house of the art Dresden
 1975: Vadim Vladimirovich Lazursky; Stock Exchange Association of German Booksellers in Leipzig
 1976: Joachim Kölbel
 1977: Horst Schuster, György Haiman, Siegfried Hempel, Hans Marquardt
 1978: HAP Grieshaber
 1979: Gert Wunderlich
 1980: Edition Leipzig
 1981: Hans Fronius
 1982: Tibor Szántó, Helmut Selle
 1983: Siegfried Hoffmann
 1984: Elizabeth Shaw
 1985: Dmitri Spiridonowitsch Bisti
 1986: Jiri Salamoun
 1987: Fritz Helmut Landshoff
 1988: Lothar Reher
 1989: Yü Bing-Nan, Klaus Ensikat
 1990: Heinz Hellmis
 1991: Oldrich Hlavsa
 1992: Gutenberg Book Guild; Jürgen Seuss, Hans Peter Willberg
 1993: Kurt Löb
 1995: Wilhelm Neufeld
 1997: Květa Pacovská
 1999: Jost Hochuli
 2001: Irma Boom
 2003: Wolf Erlbruch
 2005: Alvaro Sotillo
 2007: Ahn Sang-soo
 2009: Uwe Loesch
 2011: Karl-Georg Hirsch
 2013: Friedrich Pfäfflin
 2015: Jan Philipp Reemtsma
 2017: Klaus Detjen
 2019: Fonts for Freedom

References 

Awards established in 1959
Arts awards in Germany
Book art awards
Municipal awards
Leipzig